The Historical Panorama of Alabama Agriculture was a series of murals commissioned by the Alabama Extension Service (now Alabama Cooperative Extension System) and partly funded by the Works Progress Administration for the 1939 Alabama State Fair, held October 2–7 in Birmingham.

John Augustus Walker

The commission was assigned to John Augustus Walker, a well-known Mobile artist who had previously completed WPA-related art assignments. A founder of the Mobile Art Guild and an Alabama Gulf Coast native, Walker is known not only for his paintings and murals, which are found in private collections and in public buildings across Alabama and the Gulf Coast, but also for his work designing Mardi Gras floats, costumes and stage exhibits.

Purpose

The murals, which illustrate key periods of Alabama's agricultural development starting with Native Americans, are among the most valued artifacts associated with Alabama Extension's almost century-long association with agriculture.  The murals also are considered prime examples of WPA-related art associated with the Great Depression era.

Walker originally was commissioned to paint 29 murals for the exhibition, all of which were supposed to depict farm life from Alabama's agricultural past.  However, due to time constraints, he managed to complete only ten.  The project was one of several funded during the period by the WPA to support talented young arts such as Walker, aged 37 at the time, and to encourage continued interest in the arts during and immediately following the Depression.

The murals were designed as much for their educational impact as their aesthetic appeal.  Laying out the purpose for the paintings, then-Alabama Extension Director P. O. Davis noted that "agriculture in Alabama, and in this nation, is in a period of change — a change toward improvement and progress."

Alabama, Davis stressed, was diversifying, moving from a primarily cotton-based economy "into a combination of cotton and other cash crops plus livestock and poultry."  He envisioned these murals and the supporting fair exhibits not only as a celebration of the past but also as a means of focusing farmers on a "vision of the future."

"It [the panorama] will reveal also that Alabama agriculture is not only changing and improving but that it is geared to go forward in a big way and in terms of efficiency and economy," Davis wrote.

In this sense, Davis viewed the murals as yet another form of educational communication that had distinguished previous Extension efforts — a means for "guiding farmers as to what to do and how to do it."

The catalyst

In an era when many forms of mass communication were still in their infancy, state fairs were considered a prime venue for this type of educational outreach.  Indeed, state fairs were big business in the Depression-era Thirties — a place where thousands of financially hard-pressed Americans temporarily could forget their economic problems and the troubling portents of war in Europe.

Agricultural exhibits were a mainstay of these state fairs. According to Bruce Dupree, an Alabama Cooperative Extension System art specialist and Walker expert,

Fairgoers moved excitedly through poorly lit, unair-conditioned buildings to view prize-winning livestock, colorful quilts, farm exhibits, baking contests, and canning demonstrations. In Alabama, each of the state's 67 counties was given space to showcase local produce and a specific agricultural industry.

Managing the large number of entries often proved to be a daunting task for fair planners, leading many of them to consider different strategies for handling these agricultural exhibits.  In fact, the Historical Panorama of Alabama Agriculture was conceived as one such new strategy.

The panorama was the brainchild of fair vice president Warren Leech, who wanted to develop a radically different and more effective way to showcase Alabama agriculture by combining all of these separate county exhibits into one agricultural show.

Leech paid a visit to Alabama Extension Service Director P. O. Davis in Auburn to discuss his ideas.   Davis quickly grasped this opportunity, seeing it as a way to highlight the role served by the Alabama Extension Service and the Alabama Polytechnic Institute (now Auburn University) in advancing the state's food and fiber sector.

Planning

Davis and other Alabama Extension administrators apparently invested full confidence in Walker's artist abilities.  In an "Informal Report on Alabama Pageant of Agriculture Exhibit" submitted to Davis in May 1939, the project was described as being "in good hands" and was predicted to be "unusually successful."  Moreover, Extension employees dispatched to Mobile to consult with Walker reported to Davis that they were confident that panorama would "present Alabama agriculture in a most interesting way" and that "the entire series, especially if they are properly interpreted, should make a very strong impression on those who see it."

Alabama Extension project planners also were impressed with the price associated with the commission.   The sponsors reasoned that with the WPA underwriting, they were getting a series of murals with a market value of $6,000 for "approximately the cost of materials involved."

Even so, these planners were unwilling to defer solely to Walker's talents and exercised creative oversight throughout the course of the project. Davis and other Alabama Extension employees involved with the project expressed concerns about historical accuracy, however inaccurate some of their historical views may have been.  For example, in a letter dated April 18, 1939, Alabama Extension Agricultural Editor Donald Robertson instructed the Walker to replace the male depicted in a proposed sketch about Native American agricultural life with a female, because "according to Indian Legend, the women did most of the field work while the men did the hunting and 'took life easy.'"

Along with other detailed suggestions, Robertson also suggested another picture that would depict "the arrival of women folks on the farm and perhaps one or two children to show the beginning of a well-rounded farm family."

Walker probably never expected the level of intense scrutiny from Auburn that would accompany design and planning of the murals and the supporting exhibits.  Not only Walker's Extension Service sponsors but also U.S. Department of Agriculture employees became intimately involved in the planning, offering detailed instructions even for the selection and placement of the objects for display in the foreground of the murals. For example, each mural was to have a drapery border and a table in front of it filled with produce, farm implements, or household items that would complete the artwork.

"The objects should be 100 percent pertinent to the stage of development represented by the mural," according to instructions provided by H.T. Baldwin, an employee with the Extension Exhibits Division of the USDA, one of several communications professionals who traveled throughout the country providing advice to state Extension services and providing quality control for Cooperative Extension-related visuals projects.

Baldwin also advised placing more objects in the foreground to relieve Walker of detailed painting.  Due to lighting constraints, he also recommended that Walker use dull-finish colors rather than oils, which would create a shiny surface.

Moreover, he suggested that Walker include descriptive signage to help visitors "absorb" the information of all episodes.  Baldwin also recommended that the interior elements of the hall be painted in API's school colors.

The effort placed immense physical and mental strain on Walker, who, in addition to managing the demands of a day job, also was contending with a serious family illness at the time.  With only three weeks remaining before the fair's opening, Walker worked feverishly to complete the task, even though by then, the project had been scaled down to 10 murals.  The artist was also given full authority to purchase any materials needed to complete the exhibit and to fill the space made vacant by the 10 unfinished paintings.  He ordered 40 new spotlights, more than 600 yards of curtain-like fabric, hundreds of feet of rope, and all the crepe paper he could find to cover the exhibit hall ceiling.

The murals ended up approximately 7.5 feet by 5.5 feet with dry color on unbleached canvas.  Also, because the murals were intended to last only for the duration of the fair, Walker painted them with tempera, a water-based and less durable medium, rather than his preferred medium of oils.

Fair

The fair and the panorama turned out to be well-attended, highly successful undertakings. Record crowds filled the midway, grandstand, and exhibit halls throughout the day and night.

Then-Governor Frank Dixon praised the fair and the planning that preceded it, describing the fair as "the best ever and a model for the entire nation to see."

The fair also garnered front-page news coverage for five consecutive days, apparently filling the role fairs typically served during this era — diverting a weary state from its economic woes and concerns about the looming conflict in Europe .  Moreover, the agriculture and industry exhibits appeared to generate more public interest than the rides and games.

Aftermath

Immediately following the Alabama State Fair, the murals were packed and shipped to Shreveport, Louisiana, for display at the Louisiana State Fair, held October 21–30, 1939.

Sometime thereafter, the murals were taken to Auburn University and stored in Duncan Hall, the state headquarters of the Alabama Extension Service, where they remained basically undisturbed for the next 45 years until they were rediscovered in the early 1980s.  They were subsequently refurbished and displayed in Foy Student Union on the Auburn University campus.  Following their rediscovery, at least one Walker admirer advocated purchasing the murals from Auburn University and returning them to the artist's native Mobile.

However, they remained in Auburn.  In fact, as part of Auburn University's sesquicentennial celebration in 2006, the Alabama Cooperative Extension System, through Dupree's efforts, reintroduced the paintings after more than 20 years with a public lecture and display in the Foy Union Student Union Gallery.

The son and grandchildren of the late artist were on hand for the lecture and exhibition to greet attendees and to answer questions.

Notes

 Dupree, Bruce (Summer 2008) "John Augustus Walker and the Historical Panorama of Alabama Agriculture." Alabama Heritage. No. 89

External links
 Database of WPA murals

History of Alabama
Alabama Cooperative Extension System
Auburn University
Murals in Alabama
Works Progress Administration in Alabama
1939 in art
1939 establishments in Alabama